Murgantia is a genus of stink bugs in the family Pentatomidae. There are at least 12 described species in Murgantia.

Species
These six species belong to the genus Murgantia:
 Murgantia angularis (Walker, 1867) i c g
 Murgantia bifasciata Herrich-Schaeffer, 1836 g
 Murgantia histrionica (Hahn, 1834) i c g b (harlequin bug)
 Murgantia tessellata (Amyot and Serville, 1843) i c g
 Murgantia varicolor (Westwood, 1837) i c g
 Murgantia violascens (Westwood, 1837) i c g b
Data sources: i = ITIS, c = Catalogue of Life, g = GBIF, b = Bugguide.net

References

Further reading

External links

 

Pentatomidae genera
Articles created by Qbugbot
Pentatomini